Skarbimierz  is a village in Brzeg County (Brieg), Opole Voivodeship (Oppeln), in south-western Poland. It is the seat of the gmina (administrative district) called Gmina Skarbimierz.

The village has a population of 191.

From 2007, as part of the Wałbrzych Special Economic Zone, UK confectioner Cadbury started building a £100m chewing gum plant in the area. The factory was then expanded to include chocolate production, moving the majority of the products made at the Somerdale Factory in Keynsham, Bristol to the site, for reasons of seeking to increase the profitability of Cadbury plc.

References

Skarbimierz